Senator Bowers may refer to:

Clyde T. Bowers (1881–1968), Virginia State Senate
Eaton J. Bowers (1865–1939), Mississippi State Senate
Elaine Bowers (born 1963), Kansas State Senate
Jack E. Bowers (1925–2007), Illinois State Senate
Kathryn I. Bowers (1943–2015), Tennessee State Senate
William W. Bowers (1834–1917), California State Senate